Terbium phosphide is an inorganic compound of terbium and phosphorus with the chemical formula TbP.

Synthesis
TbP can be obtained by the reaction of terbium and red phosphorus at 800–1000 °C:
4 Tb + P4 → 4 TbP

The compound can also be obtained by the reaction of sodium phosphide and anhydrous terbium chloride at 700~800 °C.

Physical properties
TbP undergoes a phase transition at 40 GPa from a NaCl-structure to a CsCl-structure. The compound can be sintered with zinc sulfide to make a green phosphor layer.

TbP forms crystals of a cubic system, space group Fm3m.

Uses
The compound is a semiconductor used in high power, high frequency applications and in laser diodes and other photo diodes.

References

Phosphides
Terbium compounds
Semiconductors
Rock salt crystal structure